Minehead Lifeboat Station is the base for Royal National Lifeboat Institution (RNLI) search and rescue operations at Minehead, Somerset in England. The first lifeboat was stationed in the town in 1901 but since 1976 two inshore lifeboats (ILBs) have been operated, a B Class rigid-hulled boat and an inflatable D Class.

History
Minehead is on the Somerset coast at the east end of the cliffs of Exmoor. The RNLI built a boathouse at a cost of £785 in 1901 and the first lifeboat was placed in service on 11 December. For two years the boat was launched across the beach using skids but from 1903 a carriage was provided. The boat house was modified in 1950 by the addition of a garage for the tractor that now pulled the lifeboat in and out of the sea. In 1993 the building was modified again to take a new boat and the opportunity was taken to modernise the crew facilities and add a gift shop alongside.

In 1939 the station's pulling and sailing boat was withdrawn and replaced by a motor lifeboat. In December 1941 the lifeboat's coxswain and signaller took the coxswain's own boat out in response to reports of wreckage, but it struck a naval mine and was sunk with the loss of both their lives.

In 1970 an ILB was allocated to the station; it was kept in the tractor garage. This proved a success so on 20 May 1973 the all-weather lifeboat was withdrawn. The following year a second, larger ILB arrived. It was the first RNLI station to use a Tooltrak tractor to launch its D Class lifeboat. This replaced an older Argocat tractor in 2011.

Fundraising started in 2021 to modernise the facilities and to enlarge the boat house so that both lifeboats could be launched more quickly.

Description
The stone-built boat house is situated at the western end of the town beyond the harbour where there is access to water at all states of the tide. There is a hard standing in front of the boat house but boats are taken down the pebble beach when launched. The original boat house has been extended with a garage at the back and a fund-raising gift shop on the west side.

Area of operation
Adjacent lifeboats are at Ilfracombe Lifeboat Station to the west, and Burnham-on-Sea Lifeboat Station to the east.

Current lifeboats

  B824 Richard and Elizabeth Deaves (on station 2007)
  (IB1) D712 Christine (on station 2009)

Former lifeboats
'ON' is the RNLI's sequential Official Number; 'Op. No.' is the operational number painted onto the boat.

Pulling and sailing lifeboats

Motor lifeboats

Inshore lifeboats

Notes

See also
 List of RNLI stations

References

Bibliography

External links

 Official station website
 RNLI station information

Lifeboat stations in Somerset
Lifeboat Station